Noh Jong-hyun (born January 16, 1993) is a South Korean actor.

Career 
Noh Jong-hyun made his television debut in the 2017 romantic comedy Because This Is My First Life in which he portrayed the female lead's little brother. The following year, he appeared in OCN's miniseries Short and gained more recognition after playing the youngest detective of the team in Life on Mars, adapted from the British television series of the same name.

In 2019, Noh made a cameo appearance in Romance Is a Bonus Book. He then portrayed the male lead's best friend in tvN's He Is Psychometric. He also joined the cast of Hell Is Other People, adapted from the webtoon of the same name.

In 2020, Noh appeared in Blackout, an episode of Drama Stage's third season. He was also cast in Kkondae Intern and Live On. He will also make his film debut in A Mathematician in Wonderland.

In 2021, Noh is set to star in Youth, a television series based on the BTS Universe.

Filmography

Film

Television series

Music video appearances

Awards and nominations

References

External links 
 Noh Jong-hyun at Vibe Actors 
 

1993 births
Living people
South Korean male actors
South Korean male television actors
South Korean male stage actors
South Korean male musical theatre actors
Dongguk University alumni
People from Busan